Estadio Panamericano Parque Este is a soccer stadium in Santo Domingo Este, Dominican Republic.  It is currently used for football matches and hosts the home games of Club Barcelona Atletico of the Liga Dominicana de Fútbol.  The stadium holds 3,200 spectators.

External links
http://www.balompiedominicano.com/2015/03/estadios-llenos-en-la-primera-jornada.html
http://int.soccerway.com/teams/dominican-republic/barcelona/8534/
http://ldf.com.do/club-barcelona-atletico/

Football venues in the Dominican Republic
Buildings and structures in Santo Domingo Province
Sports venues in Santo Domingo
Tourist attractions in Santo Domingo Province